Jason Wight (born July 21, 1979 in West Springfield, Virginia) is a male beach volleyball player from the United States who won the gold medal at the NORCECA Circuit 2009 at Cayman Islands playing with Michael Brüning.

He also won the AVP Young Guns 2009 Muskegon tournament playing with Ivan Mercer.

Awards

National Team
 NORCECA Beach Volleyball Circuit Cayman Islands 2009  Gold Medal
 NORCECA Beach Volleyball Circuit Boca Chica 2009  Silver Medal

AVP Pro Tour
 AVP Pro Tour Young Guns Muskegon 2009  Gold Medal

References

External links
 
 AVP Profile

1979 births
Living people
American men's beach volleyball players
People from West Springfield, Virginia